Bharath Shankar (born 20 May 1994) is an Indian cricketer who plays for Tamil Nadu. He made his first-class debut on 21 December 2014 in the 2014–15 Ranji Trophy. He made his Twenty20 debut on 9 January 2016 in the 2015–16 Syed Mushtaq Ali Trophy. In June 2016, he was named as the Collegiate Cricketer of the Year at the 86th Tamil Nadu Cricket Association awards.

References

External links
 

1994 births
Living people
Indian cricketers
Tamil Nadu cricketers
Cricketers from Chennai